Castellini Bluff is a rock bluff rising to c. 500 m between Dibble Bluff and Mount Nesos in west White Island, Ross Archipelago. Named by the Advisory Committee on Antarctic Names in 2005 after Michael A. Castellini, Institute of Marine Sciences, University of Alaska, Fairbanks, who studied the Weddell seal in McMurdo Sound sea ice areas from 1977 to 2004, including winter season research at White Island with Randall William Davis in 1981.

References

Ross Archipelago